Histone-lysine N-methyltransferase 2A also known as acute lymphoblastic leukemia 1 (ALL-1), myeloid/lymphoid or mixed-lineage leukemia 1 (MLL1), or zinc finger protein HRX (HRX) is an enzyme that in humans is encoded by the KMT2A gene.

MLL1 is a histone methyltransferase deemed a positive global regulator of gene transcription. This protein belongs to the group of histone-modifying enzymes comprising transactivation domain 9aaTAD and is involved in the epigenetic maintenance of transcriptional memory. Its role as an epigenetic regulator of neuronal function is an ongoing area of research.

Function

Transcriptional regulation 

KMT2A gene encodes a transcriptional coactivator that plays an essential role in regulating gene expression during early development and hematopoiesis. The encoded protein contains multiple conserved functional domains. One of these domains, the SET domain, is responsible for its histone H3 lysine 4 (H3K4) methyltransferase activity which mediates chromatin modifications associated with epigenetic transcriptional activation. Enriched in the nucleus, the MLL1 enzyme trimethylates H3K4 (H3K4me3). It also upregulates mono- and dimethylation of H3K4. This protein is processed by the enzyme Taspase 1 into two fragments, MLL-C (~180 kDa) and MLL-N (~320 kDa). These fragments then assemble into different multi-protein complexes that regulate the transcription of specific target genes, including many of the HOX genes.

Transcriptome profiling after deletion of MLL1 in cortical neurons revealed decreased promoter-bound H3K4me3 peaks at 318 genes, with 31 of these having significantly decreased expression and promoter binding. Among them were Meis2, a homeobox transcription factor critical for development of forebrain neurons and Satb2, a protein involved in neuronal differentiation.

Multiple chromosomal translocations involving this gene are the cause of certain acute lymphoid leukemias and acute myeloid leukemias. Alternate splicing results in multiple transcript variants.

Cognition and emotion 

MLL1 has been shown to be an important epigenetic regulator of complex behaviors. Rodent models of MLL1 dysfunction in forebrain neurons showed that conditional deletion results in elevated anxiety and defective cognition. Prefrontal cortex-specific knockout of MLL1 results in the same phenotypes, as well as working memory deficits.

Stem cells 

MLL1 has been found to be an important regulator of epiblast-derived stem cells, post-implantation epiblast derived stem cells which display pluripotency yet many recognizable differences from the traditional embryonic stem cells derived from inner cell mass prior to implantation. Suppression of MLL1 expression was shown to be adequate for inducing ESC-like morphology and behavior within 72 hours of treatment. It has been proposed that the small molecule inhibitor MM-401, which was used to inhibit MLL1, changes the distribution of H3K4me1, the single methylation of the histone H3 lysine 4, to be significantly downregulated at MLL1 targets thus leading to decreased expression of MLL1 targets, rather than a direct regulation of pluripotency core markers.

Structure

Gene 

KMT2A gene has 37 exons and resides on chromosome 11 at q23.

Protein 

KMT2A has over a dozen of binding partners and is cleaved into two pieces, a larger N-terminal fragment, involved in gene repression, and a smaller C-terminal fragment, which is a transcriptional activator. The cleavage, followed by the association of the two fragments, is necessary for KMT2A to be fully active. Like many other methyltransferases, the KMT2 family members exist in multisubunit nuclear complexes (human COMPASS), where other subunits also mediate the enzymatic activity.

Clinical significance 
Abnormal H3K4 trimethylation has been implicated in several neurological disorders such as autism. Humans with cognitive and neurodevelopmental disease often have dysregulation of H3K4 methylation in prefrontal cortex (PFC) neurons. It also may participate in the process of GAD67 downregulation in schizophrenia.

Rearrangements of the MLL1 gene are associated with aggressive acute leukemias, both lymphoblastic and myeloid. Despite being an aggressive leukemia, the MLL1 rearranged sub-type had the lowest mutation rates reported for any cancer.

Mutations in MLL1 cause Wiedemann-Steiner syndrome and Acute lymphoblastic leukemia. The leukemia cells of up to 80 percent of infants with ALL-1 have a chromosomal rearrangement that fuses the MLL1 gene to a gene on a different chromosome.

Interactions 

MLL (gene) has been shown to interact with:

 ASH2L, 
 CREBBP, 
 CTBP1, 
 HDAC1, 
 HCFC1, 
 MEN1, 
 PPIE,
 PPP1R15A, 
 RBBP5,  and
 WDR5.

References

Further reading

External links 
 MLL OMIM Entry: MYELOID/LYMPHOID OR MIXED LINEAGE LEUKEMIA GENE; MLL
 
 Gene MLL on the Atlas of Genetics and Oncology

Epigenetics
Proteins
Transcription factors
Human proteins